Crotched Pond is located south of Indian Lake, New York. Fish species present in the lake include brook trout and white sucker. There is access via trail from east shore of Indian Lake. No motors are allowed on this lake.

References

Lakes of New York (state)
Lakes of Hamilton County, New York